Manuel Doblado Partida (12 June 1818 – 19 June 1865) was a Mexican prominent liberal politician and lawyer who served as congressman, Governor of Guanajuato, Minister of Foreign Affairs (1861) in the cabinet of President Juárez and fought in the War of Reform.

He was born in San Pedro, Piedra Gorda, Guanajuato, retired to the U.S. for health reasons, and died in New York City.

See also
War of Reform
Manuel Doblado, Guanajuato
Soledad de Doblado, Veracruz

References

1818 births
1865 deaths
Liberalism in Mexico
Mexican Secretaries of Foreign Affairs
Governors of Guanajuato
Governors of Jalisco
Members of the Chamber of Deputies (Mexico)
Mexican generals
Politicians from Guanajuato
20th-century Mexican politicians